The International Sailing Schools Association also known as ISSA is an international organization associating 3,500 sailing schools from all over the world. ISSA was founded in London and Paris in 1969 as a result of a joint initiative of the sailing communities of France, Poland, Italy, Switzerland and Great Britain.

In 1982 the Parliamentary Assembly of the Council of Europe granted the ISSA consultative status as an NGO.

In 2005 World Sailing discussed the role of ISSA at its annual conference.

Presidents

1969–1973 – Guido Colnaghi
1973–1977 – Luc Gueissaz
1977–1984 – Roger Decombat
1984–1993 – Yves Aumon
1993–1997 – Veijo Meisalo
1997–2006 – Steve Colgate
2006–2008 – Martin Pryer
2008–2016 – Joan Basacoma
2019–present – Tomasz Lipski
[Source ISSA]

External links 
 Międzynarodowe Stowarzyszenie Szkół Żeglarskich ISSA w Polsce (ISSA in Poland)

References 

1969 establishments
International educational organizations
Sailing (sport)
Training organizations
Yachting associations